Deng Zixin (born 1957) is a Chinese microbiologist and Professor of Microbiology at Shanghai Jiao Tong University.

Born in Hubei, China, he graduated from Huazhong Agricultural University with a BSc in microbiology in 1982 and completed his PhD on the genetics of Streptomyces at the University of East Anglia in 1987. He was made a Member of the Chinese Academy of Sciences in 2005, a Fellow of The World Academy of Sciences in 2006, and a Fellow of the American Academy of Microbiology in 2010.

References

1957 births
Living people
Alumni of the University of East Anglia
Biologists from Hubei
Chinese microbiologists
Educators from Hubei
Members of the Chinese Academy of Sciences
People from Shiyan
Academic staff of Shanghai Jiao Tong University
TWAS fellows
Academic staff of Wuhan University
Fellows of the American Academy of Microbiology